Montreal Children's Hospital is a children's hospital in Montreal, Quebec, Canada. Founded in 1904, it is affiliated with the McGill University Health Centre (MUHC) and McGill University, Faculty of Medicine.

The hospital has 154 single-patient rooms, 52-bed neonatology unit, 6 operating rooms and 6 intervention rooms. It has two blocks. Block A has pediatric outpatient services. Block B has pediatric inpatient units, which include a Neonatal Intensive Care Unit (NICU) and a Pediatric Intensive Care Unit (PICU). It houses a pediatric emergency department, operating rooms and perioperative services, day hospitals and some Allied Health Services.

History

The Montreal Children's Hospital (MCH) first opened on the rented premise of 500 Guy Street on January 30, 1904. It was the first hospital in Montreal with the sole mandate of providing care for sick children. In 1909, the growing number of patients required a move to new premises on Cedar Avenue, designed by David Robertson Brown (1869–1946). In 1920, the hospital became a teaching hospital affiliated with McGill University.

The hospital has achieved a number of "firsts", including the first speech clinic in a pediatric hospital in 1933, the first division of medical genetics in 1949 and the first department of psychiatry in 1950. The neonatology division was the first to create a neonatal transport team in Québec, dedicated to the ground transportation of unstable newborns. As well, in 1991, the neonatology division created the first provincial extracorporeal membrane oxygenation (ECMO) program to assist neonates with severe respiratory distress and pulmonary hypertension. The Montreal Children's Hospital, affiliated to McGill University, is now home to the only training programs for pediatric nurse practitioner, neonatal hemodynamics, neonatal follow-up and neonatal scholar in the province of Quebec. The increasing number of services required another expansion.  A relocation took place to 2300 Tupper Street in 1956, and it was renamed the Montreal Children's Hospital.

In August 1997, the Montreal Children's Hospital merged with the Royal Victoria Hospital, the Montreal General Hospital, the Montreal Neurological Institute and Hospital and the Montreal Chest Institute to form the McGill University Health Centre.

The location of the Montreal Children's Hospital at 2300 Tupper Street officially closed at 11:00 on May 24, 2015, after 68 patients were transferred to the new Glen Site at 1001 Décarie Boulevard. The new Glen Site Montreal Children's Hospital opened its emergency doors at 5 AM. The Glen Site is composed of different hospital centres. Since the move to the Glen site, the Montreal Children's Hospital and the Royal Victoria Hospital have the capacity to provide on-site advanced maternal and perinatal care, such as ex-utero intrapartum treatment. It is the only centre on the island of Montreal with fully array of intensive-care (including fetal interventions, ECMO, dialysis, neurosurgery, extreme of prematurity and cardiac surgery) for both the mother and the newborn.

In 2011, it was the first pediatric hospital in Quebec to use high-frequency jet ventilation in the context of neonatal respiratory failure. It also has a strong tradition of pediatric and neonatal research, with some laboratories doing translational work in the clinical context, such as: the NeoCardioLab, the NeoBrainLab, the Neonatal Health Systems Research, the abcdResearch lab and the Smart Hospital.

Gallery

See also
 Centre hospitalier universitaire Sainte-Justine - Montreal's other pediatric hospital

References

Côte-des-Neiges–Notre-Dame-de-Grâce
Hospitals in Montreal
Hospital buildings completed in 1956
Children's hospitals in Canada
Hospitals established in 1904
McGill University buildings